Shahsavan Kandi or Shah Savan Kandi or Shahsovan Kandi may refer to:
 Shahsavan Kandi-ye Sofla
 Shahsavan Kandi Rural District